Joshua Jefferis (born 29 August 1985) is an Australian artistic gymnast. He was an Australian Institute of Sport scholarship holder. He has won medals at the 2006 and 2010 Commonwealth Games.

Personal
Jefferis was born on 29 August 1985  in  Brisbane, Queensland. He was educated at the Anglican Church Grammar School. In November 2010, he completed a degree in Sports Science, and then enrolled in a program that will enable him to become a physiotherapist.

Artistic gymnastics

Jefferis is a parallel bars and rings specialist,  starting in the sport when he was only two years old.  He was first coached by Anthony Beake at Y-West.

In 1992 as a seven-year-old with Y-West, Jefferis became part of the Queensland HPC development program and stayed with the program for three years.  From 1995 to 2005, he trained and was on scholarship with the Queensland Academy of Sport, before he earned a scholarship with the Australian Institute of Sport in 2005. Since 2005, he has been coached by Vladimir Vatkin.  , he is still on scholarship at the Australian Institute of Sport.

Jefferis represented Australia at the 2002, 2006 and 2010 Commonwealth Games.  At the 2006 Commonwealth Games, he earned a gold medal in the men's all around event, a gold medal in the rings, and a silver medal in the team competition. At the 2010 Commonwealth Games, he helped Australia win their first gold medal in the men's team event, and took an individual gold on the parallel bars and bronze in the all around event. He competed in the World Championships in 2003, 2005, 2006, 2007, 2010, and 2011.  At the 2003 Championships, he was the youngest member of the Australian all around team.  His best performance at Worlds was twelfth place in the all around competition in 2006.

In January 2012, Jefferis was passed over by Gymnastics Australia to participate at a London Olympic Games test event. However, after Sam Offord injured his ankle, he beat out training partner and national team teammate Thomas Pichler for a spot on the team. Jefferis represented Australia at the 2012 Summer Olympics in men's artistic gymnastics. He was officially selected on 1 June 2012, one of the first to be named to Australia's gymnastic squad, and was Australia's only male artistic gymnast at the Games.  Jefferis was twenty-six years old when he made his Olympic debut. His family faced difficulty getting tickets to watch him compete, as Gymnastics Australia was only able to secure two tickets per gymnast at the Games.

References

External links

 
 
 
 

1985 births
Living people
Australian Institute of Sport gymnasts
Australian male artistic gymnasts
Gymnasts at the 2002 Commonwealth Games
Gymnasts at the 2006 Commonwealth Games
Gymnasts at the 2010 Commonwealth Games
Commonwealth Games gold medallists for Australia
Gymnasts at the 2012 Summer Olympics
Olympic gymnasts of Australia
People educated at Anglican Church Grammar School
Commonwealth Games silver medallists for Australia
Commonwealth Games bronze medallists for Australia
Commonwealth Games medallists in gymnastics
21st-century Australian people
Medallists at the 2006 Commonwealth Games
Medallists at the 2010 Commonwealth Games